Sheridan is a surname of Irish origin. It is an anglicized version of the Irish O'Sirideáin (or Ó Sirideáin), originating in County Longford, Ireland. In Irish, it means descendant of Sheridan ("the searcher").

Notable people with the surname "Sheridan" include

A
Aishling Sheridan (born 1996), Irish sportswoman
Alan Sheridan (1934–2015), English author
Alex Sheridan (born 1948), Scottish footballer
Alison Sheridan, British archaeologist
Amy Sheridan, American aviator
Andrew Sheridan (born 1979), English rugby union footballer
Andrew Sheridan (cricketer), Irish cricketer
Ann Sheridan (1915–1967), American actress
Arthur V. Sheridan (1888–1952), American engineer

B
Beatriz Sheridan (1934–2006), Mexican actress and director
Betsy Sheridan (1758–1837), Irish diarist
Bill Sheridan (born 1959), American football coach
Bill Sheridan (basketball) (1942–2020), American basketball coach
Bradley Sheridan (born 1980), Australian basketball player
Brian Sheridan, American Paralympic cyclist

C
Carl V. Sheridan (1925–1944), American soldier
Caroline Henrietta Sheridan (1779–1851), English novelist
Cathal Sheridan (disambiguation), multiple people
Cecil Sheridan (1910–1980), Irish comedian
Chris Sheridan (disambiguation), multiple people
Cillian Sheridan (born 1989), Irish footballer
Clare Sheridan (1885–1970), British sculptor
Cosy Sheridan (born 1964), American singer-songwriter

D
Dan Sheridan (1916–1963), Irish-American actor
Dana Sheridan, American flute maker
Danny Sheridan (1950–2016), American entertainment manager
Darren Sheridan (born 1967), English footballer
David Sheridan (disambiguation), multiple people
Dick Sheridan (born 1941), American football coach
Dinah Sheridan (1920–2012), English-born actress
Dixie Sheridan, American photojournalist
Dorothy Sheridan (born 1948), British archivist

E
Eamonn Sheridan (born 1989), Irish rugby union player
Ed Sheridan (born 1957), American soccer player
Eileen Sheridan (disambiguation), multiple people
Eloise Sheridan (born 1985), Australian cricket umpire

F
Frances Sheridan (1724–1766), Irish novelist and dramatist
Frances Keith Sheridan (1812–1882), Australian teacher
Frank Sheridan (disambiguation), multiple people

G
Gail Sheridan (1916–1982), American actress
George Sheridan (footballer) (1929–1986), English footballer
George Sheridan (politician) (1840–1896), American politician
Georgette Sheridan (born 1952), Canadian politician
Greg Sheridan (born 1956), Australian journalist
Guillermo Sheridan (born 1950), Mexican writer

H
Henry Brinsley Sheridan (1820–1906), English politician
Hugh Sheridan (born 1985), Australian actor
Hugh Sheridan (boxer) (1920–2005), New Zealand boxer

J
Jack Sheridan (disambiguation), multiple people
Jake Sheridan (born 1986), English footballer
James Sheridan (disambiguation), multiple people 
Jamey Sheridan (born 1951), American actor
Janie Sheridan, New Zealand academic
Jeff Sheridan (born 1948), American magician
Jim Sheridan (born 1949), Irish film director
Jim Sheridan (politician) (1952–2022), British politician
Joe Sheridan (1914–2000), Irish politician
Joe Sheridan (Gaelic footballer), Irish Gaelic footballer
John Sheridan (disambiguation), multiple people
Joseph Alfred Sheridan (1882–1964), Irish lawyer
Juan Sheridan (1925–1969), Canadian football player

K
Kailen Sheridan (born 1995), Canadian footballer
Kathy Sheridan, Irish journalist
Katie Sheridan (born 1986), English actress
Keith Sheridan (born 1971), Scottish cricketer
Kelly Sheridan (born 1977), Canadian voice actor
Kirsten Sheridan, Irish film director
Kriss Sheridan (born 1989), Polish-American singer

L
Lanto Sheridan (born 1988), British polo player
Leisa Sheridan (born 1964), American actress
Leo J. Sheridan (1897–1975), American ambassador
Lionel Astor Sheridan (born 1927), American academic administrator
Lisa Sheridan (1974–2019), American actress
Liz Sheridan (1929–2022), American actress
Louisa Henrietta Sheridan (1810–1841), English writer

M
Malachy Sheridan (1966–2002), Irish bobsledder
Margaret Sheridan (disambiguation), multiple people
Mark Sheridan (1864–1918), English comedian
Martin Sheridan (1881–1918), Irish-American athlete
Mary Sheridan (1899–1978), English pediatrician 
Matt Sheridan (born 1977), Canadian football player
Maurice Sheridan (born 1974), Irish Gaelic footballer
Michael Sheridan (disambiguation), multiple people
Mike Sheridan (born 1991), Danish music producer
Mikkayla Sheridan (born 1995), Australian swimmer
Monica Sheridan (1912—1993), Irish chef

N
Ned Sheridan (1842–1923), Australian cricketer
Neill Sheridan (1921–2015), American baseball player
Niall Sheridan (1912–1998), Irish poet
Nick Sheridan (born 1988), American football coach
Nicolette Fay Sheridan, New Zealand academic
Nicollette Sheridan (born 1963), British actress
Noel Sheridan (1936–2006), Irish painter

P
Pat Sheridan (born 1957), American baseball player
Patrick Sheridan (1922–2011), American prelate
Patrick Sheridan (Bishop of Cloyne) (1638–1682), Irish bishop
Peter Sheridan (disambiguation), multiple people
Philip Sheridan (1831–1888), American general

R
Red Sheridan (1896–1975), American baseball player
Richard Sheridan (disambiguation), multiple people
Rob Sheridan (born 1979), American graphic designer
Roberta Sheridan (1864–1918), American teacher
Rondell Sheridan (born 1958), American actor
Ryan Sheridan (disambiguation), multiple people

S
Sara Sheridan (born 1968), Scottish activist
Serena Sheridan (born 1985), New Zealand cyclist
Sol N. Sheridan (1858–1936), American historian
Sonia Sheridan (1925–2021), American artist
Susan Sheridan (1947–2015), English voice actress
Sybil Sheridan (born 1953), British writer

T
Taylor Sheridan (born 1970), American screenwriter
Thomas Sheridan (disambiguation), multiple people
Tony Sheridan (disambiguation), multiple people
Tye Sheridan (born 1996), American actor

W
Walter Sheridan (1925–1995), American investigator
Wes Sheridan (born 1960), Canadian politician
Will Sheridan (born 1985), American basketball player
William Sheridan (disambiguation), multiple people

Z
Zoe Sheridan (born 1968), Australian television presenter

Fictional characters
John Sheridan (Babylon 5), a lead character on the TV series
Eve Sheridan, a character in the sitcom E/R

See also
Sheridan (disambiguation), a disambiguation page for "Sheridan"
General Sheridan (disambiguation), a disambiguation page for Generals surnamed "Sheridan"
Senator Sheridan (disambiguation), a disambiguation page for Senators surnamed "Sheridan"

Other

English-language surnames
Anglicised Irish-language surnames